The following is a list of fires in high-rise buildings. A skyscraper fire or high-rise fire is a class of structural fire specific to tall buildings. Skyscraper fires are technically challenging for fire departments: they require unusually high degrees of organization and cooperation between participating firefighting units to contain and extinguish. Skyscraper fires are often multiple-alarm fires.

Notable fires in history

Gallery

See also 
 Skyscraper
 Tower block
 Firefighting
 Fire escape
List of high-rise facade fires
 The Towering Inferno (film)

References

External links 
 https://citizen.co.za/news/south-africa/local-news/2172608/bank-of-lisbon-building-site-of-deadly-joburg-fire-to-come-down/
 Windsor Building in Madrid
 East Tower in Caracas
 
 https://www.youtube.com/watch?v=3tMTSWdwvwM

Articles containing video clips